Surge Narrows Provincial Park is a provincial park in British Columbia, Canada, located on the south tip of Maurelle Island and on adjacent islands in the Discovery Islands archipelago in that province's South Coast region.

References

Provincial Parks of the Discovery Islands
Provincial parks of British Columbia
Protected areas established in 1996
1996 establishments in British Columbia